Beth Sholom is a Conservative synagogue, currently located in Frederick, Maryland.

History
Frederick Hebrew Congregation was chartered on October 6, 1917. In 1919, the congregation incorporated with name of Beth Sholom Congregation. The first synagogue was built in Brunswick, Maryland, the same year.

In 1923, the original synagogue was dedicated at the town's former Elks Club.

Yehuda E. Perkins was the rabbi in 1959. In 1961, Morris Kosman became the congregation's spiritual leader.

Beth Sholom built a community center in Frederick in 1984. The community center was intended for the preschool, religious school, youth activities, and social activities. A new, larger community center was opened in 1994.

Spiritual leaders

Rabbi Morris Kosman, a Detroit native who had served as the congregation's spiritual leader since 1961, retired and assumed emeritus status in 2010. At that time, Rabbi Murray Singerman became the congregation's new spiritual leader.  After a year and a half, Singerman resigned, and Beth Sholom was served until July 2014 by a visiting rabbi from the Jewish Theological Seminary in New York under the Gladstein Fellowship program, Rabbi Jordan Hersh and his wife, Cantor Shulie Hersh; Rabbi Hersch is an alumnus of Rabbis without Borders. In July 2014, the Hershes became the permanent spiritual leaders of Beth Sholom. 

Rabbi Hersh is also the only chaplain in Maryland's Army National Guard; he was called to serve and protect the Capitol in the wake of the insurrection there on January 6, 2021.

Kosman died October 22, 2016.

References

External links

1917 establishments in Maryland
Buildings and structures in Frederick, Maryland
Conservative synagogues in Maryland
Jewish organizations established in 1917
Synagogues in Frederick County, Maryland